Herringlose (Danish: Herringløse) is a village with a population of 395 (1 January 2022) in Roskilde municipality, Denmark.

References

Villages in Denmark
Roskilde Municipality